Big Brother 18 is the eighteenth season of various versions of television show Big Brother and may refer to:

 Big Brother 18 (U.S.), the 2016 edition of the U.S. version
 Big Brother 18 (UK), the 2017 edition of the UK version
 Big Brother Brasil 18, the 2018 edition of the Brazilian version